Chrostosoma infuscatum is a moth of the subfamily Arctiinae. It was described by Walter Rothschild in 1931. It is found in Colombia and Ecuador.

The wingspan is about 27 mm.

References

Chrostosoma
Moths described in 1931